Stefon Meyers, simply referred to as Stefon, is a fictional character portrayed by Bill Hader on Saturday Night Live. Originally appearing in a 2008 sketch with Ben Affleck, the character went on to become a correspondent on Weekend Update, SNL's recurring satirical news segment, in 2010. When asked about recommendations for events and destinations to visit for tourists and others in New York City, Stefon would suggest unusual nightclubs and parties with bizarre characters and themes. As the lines for Weekend Update are read from cue cards, Mulaney would change the script before the live broadcast to make Hader break character.

Development 
The character was created by Hader and former SNL writer John Mulaney. Stefon was inspired by real people Hader and Mulaney had encountered; one was a club promoter who sent Mulaney an e-mail about a club that "had everything," including "rooms full of broken glass" as one of the highlights. The character's mannerisms were based on a barista at a Chelsea, Manhattan coffee shop that Hader frequented.

Mulaney took inspiration from 2000s club fashion for the character's look and chose an Ed Hardy shirt because he thought it would look like the fashion in the 2003 film Party Monster.

Hader and Mulaney worked together to create Stefon's idiosyncratic manner, especially his over-the-top descriptions of nonexistent nightclubs. They lengthened the script so Weekend Update anchor Seth Meyers could comment on which jokes to cut.

The lines for Weekend Update are read from cue cards. Mulaney habitually changed the script just before the live broadcast to see if he could make Hader laugh during the sketch. Hader, forced to adapt in the moment to brand-new jokes, frequently broke character by hiding his face in his hands or laughing.

According to Hader, it is "completely ironic" that he played a character like Stefon, because he avoids loud places such as clubs.

Character 

Stefon is a flamboyantly gay "city correspondent" for Weekend Update who is knowledgeable about parties and nightclubs featuring bizarre themes and characters, which he recommends when the Weekend Update anchor asks for suggestions for tourists. He appears to be always nervous, as indicated by how he can never keep his hands still and constantly rubs them together. A possible explanation for this is his excessive consumption of recreational drugs. Stefon is apparently infatuated with Meyers; he expresses disappointment when Meyers mentions his girlfriend, and has stated that he envies Meyers' mother for changing his diapers as a child.

Stefon wears gaudy Ed Hardy shirts, multiple rings, and has an asymmetrical, highlighted haircut. His mother is named Ms. Stefon and his father is David Bowie. He lives in a trash can outside the RadioShack at 23rd Street and 7th Avenue and has a dog named Bark Ruffalo.

Appearances

Saturday Night Live 
Stefon first appeared in a 2008 sketch with Ben Affleck titled "Movie Pitch with Stefon," with Stefon portraying the outrageous brother of Affleck's more serious character, David Zolesky; however, the idea "barely worked as a sketch," said Bill Hader. "It was a long walk to get to what the sketch was about."

The character was instead introduced as a correspondent on Weekend Update the following season, after an invitation from the head of the segment. During the production for his first appearance on Weekend Update on the April 24, 2010 episode, Mulaney assumed it would be cut after rehearsal. He stated, "It was so weird that I so assumed it would be cut, and I said, 'When you cut this, can we try it again?' We just thought it was not going to be liked by anyone."

After being unable to perform the character without breaking for two and a half years, Hader successfully remained in character as Stefon during the season finale of the show's 36th season, with host Justin Timberlake. However, this appearance was much briefer than his others, with his appearance only lasting about 30 seconds.

Stefon made his last recurring Weekend Update appearance on May 18, 2013, due to Bill Hader leaving the show. After Stefon's usual comment on "New York's hottest club", Meyers again criticized his recommendations, making Stefon flee out of NBC Studios to get married. Seeing the error of his ways, Seth goes after him to the wedding at the Marble Collegiate Church on Fifth Avenue only to find out that Stefon is marrying Anderson Cooper. Seth goes in after Stefon and takes him away from the wedding back to Studio 8H, where they proclaim their love for each other.

The guests at the wedding included many of the weird types of people Stefon has mentioned during his Weekend Update segments. Ben Affleck makes a cameo appearance reprising his role as Stefon's brother, David Zolefsky. After Seth and Stefon return to the studio, various Weekend Update characters gathered to congratulate them. Seth refers to them as Seth and Stefon Meyers and closes out Weekend Update.

Guest appearances 
In his first guest appearance, Stefon returned to Weekend Update in a guest appearance along with Amy Poehler to bid Meyers adieu in his final Weekend Update, as Meyers prepared to become the new host of Late Night. Before Seth's final Weekend Update goodbye, he acknowledged Stefon as his husband.

During Hader's first time hosting SNL on October 11, 2014, Stefon recommended clubs for tourists interested in autumn in New York. Hader had particular trouble staying in character due to each club Stefon recommended including at the end of its list of features Dan Cortese. Stefon referenced his now-husband Meyers by explaining that he was at home "practicing sitting behind a desk," and ended the sketch by announcing he was pregnant.

As part of Saturday Night Lives 40th Anniversary Special, Edward Norton appeared as Stefon during the special's 40th anniversary-themed Weekend Update. Feeling like Norton was failing his impression, Stefon appeared to try to guide him into doing the correct hand gestures. After that, Meyers appeared behind both Norton and Stefon and briefly mentioned their unnamed children.

During Hader's second time hosting on March 17, 2018, Stefon returned to Weekend Update for a St. Patrick's Day-themed segment of his New York City recommendations. Stefon, who usually uses the term "midget" to describe his bizarre recommendations, chose not to use it in order to not be insensitive and consulted his attorney and conceptual piss artist named Shy (John Mulaney) for a better term, ultimately using "little people". Mulaney caused Hader to break character yet again by whispering into his ear during his brief appearance, "My girlfriend works at Yoshinoya Beef Bowl." Stefon also made a reference to spouse Seth Meyers' A Closer Look segment at Late Night.

Future appearances 

Hader commented on coming back to SNL to play Stefon during an interview with The Guardian on April 25, 2022. He said that SNL "floated" the idea of him reprising the role, but he declined, believing that playing the character now would be a bad idea because the character could be perceived as stereotypical, but he does not rule out playing the character in the future.

Outside Saturday Night Live 
In December 2011, Hader (as Stefon) and Seth Meyers made an appearance at A Funny Affair for Autism benefit.

When Late Night with Seth Meyers premiered on February 24, 2014, a Stefon matryoshka doll with a veil embellishment, originally hand-crafted by matryoshka artist Irene Hwang and commissioned for a crew holiday gift, was unveiled as part of the decor of Meyers' desk.

Unproduced movie 

Mulaney began writing a Stefon feature film before he left SNL. The film was intended to be a mockumentary, showing Stefon visiting different New York hotspots as a correspondent for Weekend Update. Mulaney wanted director Garry Marshall to play Lorne Michaels. However, the film never moved beyond an initial writing stage.

Reception 
Reception for Stefon has been generally positive. David Reddish of Queerty wrote that he loved Stefon, "in all his messy, gay glory," and that "even though Hader is straight, he made the character vulnerable and lovable."

The character has become a fan-favorite and has been considered to be Hader's most memorable character on Saturday Night Live. Hader has been frequently approached by fans who claim to know someone who acts like Stefon.

Despite being perceived as queer-coded, Stefon is not regarded as a gay icon. Joe Reid of Polygon suggests this is because he is written by a straight man (Mulaney).

See also 
 List of recurring Saturday Night Live characters and sketches (introduced 2008–2009)

Notes

References 

Television characters introduced in 2008
Fictional gay males
Saturday Night Live characters
Fictional LGBT characters in television
Saturday Night Live in the 2000s
Saturday Night Live in the 2010s